Bungad is an administrative division in eastern Metro Manila, the Philippines.

It is one of the 142 barangays of Quezon City and is bounded by Barangays Veterans Village in the north, San Antonio in the West, Paltok in the south and Philam in the east. It is part of the city district of Project 7, which includes Barangay Veterans Village.

History

Establishment 
The land sits at the frontier of San Francisco del Monte, which gives its name from the Filipino word bungad, meaning "front". It was established as a barrio under City Ordinance No. 4762 (series of 1961) on May 29, 1961. The barrio's borders were expanded to include a strip of land owned by the People's Homesite and Housing Corporation parallel to West Avenue from Baler Street to EDSA through City Ordinance No. 4860 (series of 1961) on October 9, 1961. The barrio would be converted to a barangay through City Executive Order 20, converting all barrios into barangays.

Development of North EDSA corridor 
After the completion of SM City North EDSA as the country's first SM Supermall, the West Avenue area has developed into a business and commercial hub of office and hotel buildings, automobile accessories and automotive repair shops and transport hub for commuters going to and from downtown Manila and northern Quezon City areas.

Notable landmarks include SM Cyber West at North EDSA, West Insula Condominium, Westlife Building, Cablelink Holdings (Quezon City office), Sulit Hotel along West Avenue, McDonald's along Baler Street and service stations of Shell, Caltex, Clean Fuel and Total.

Other business offices in the area are Gerry's Grill Headquarters, SBS Philippines Corporation (formerly Sytangco Philippines Corporation), PLDT STQ (formerly EDSA Quezon City Office), Uratex Corporation, Pacific Corporate Center, The West Wing Building, Hua Yan Buddhist Learning Society, Amron System and Khong Guan Biscuits Incorporated.

A number of public and private schools have also been established in the vicinity such as St. Vincent School, Kolisko Waldorf School, Montessori West School, government-run Bungad Elementary School and Judge Juan Luna High School.

Barangay and Sangguniang Kabataan officials

Punong Barangay

Members of Sangguniang Barangay

The new Barangay and SK Councils were elected on May 14, 2018.

Demographics 
Barangay Bungad is the 74th most-populated barangay in Quezon City, with a population of 7,014 people according to the 2020 census, down from a population of 8,057 people in the 2015 census.

Government 
The seat of government of Bungad is at its barangay hall located at the end of Sanchez Street.

Places of Worship 

 The Roman Catholic parish church of Santo Cristo de Bungad, located along M.H. Del Pilar Street
 Capitol City Baptist Church, located at the corner of West Avenue and Bulacan Street.

See also
Barangays of Quezon City
Legislative districts of Quezon City
Vincent Crisologo
Quezon City
Manila Light Rail Transit System Line 1
Manila Metro Rail Transit System Line 3
Manila Metro Rail Transit System Line 7
Barangay elections

References

Quezon City
Barangays of Quezon City
Barangays of Metro Manila